The Minister of Public Works was a position in the Cabinet of Canada who oversaw the public works portfolio of the federal government.

The office was established upon Confederation (1 July 1867) by Order-in-Council, and was given statutory basis later that year on December 21, through Statute 31 Victoria, c. 12. On 12 July 1996, as part of substantial governmental reorganization under the leadership of Jean Chrétien, the position was merged with that of the Minister of Supply and Services to create the office of Minister of Public Works and Government Services.

Ministers

References

Public Works (Canada)
Former Canadian ministers
Public Works (Canada)